Tony Stoecklin is an American college baseball coach and former professional baseball pitcher.
He played two seasons at SIU Edwardsville before being drafted by the Atlanta Braves in the 23rd round of the 1992 Major League Baseball draft. Stoecklin pursued his dream of a big league career for three seasons in the Braves organization, reaching the Class-A Carolina League, before spending six seasons in independent leagues. He returned to SIU Edwardsville as an assistant coach in 1999, and helped guide the team to the Division I level in 2008. Stoecklin was named head coach in July 2012.

Head coaching record
This table shows Stoecklin's record as a head coach at the Division I level.

See also
List of current NCAA Division I baseball coaches

References

External links

Living people
People from Greenville, Illinois
Bend Bandits players
Chico Heat players
Durham Bulls players
SIU Edwardsville Cougars baseball coaches
SIU Edwardsville Cougars baseball players
1970 births